Kean  is a 1940 Italian historical drama film directed by Guido Brignone and starring Rossano Brazzi, Germana Paolieri. and Sandro Salvini. It is based on the 1836 play Kean by Alexandre Dumas portraying the life of the English actor Edmund Kean.

The film's sets were designed by the art director Alfredo Manzi. It was shot at the Scalera Studios in Rome.

Cast
 Rossano Brazzi as Edmund Kean 
 Germana Paolieri as Elena Koeffeld 
 Sandro Salvini as Il conte Koeffeld 
 Mariella Lotti as Anna Demby 
 Filippo Scelzo as Il principe di Galles 
 Dino Di Luca as Lord Mewill 
 Nicola Maldacea as Salomone, il domestico 
 Oreste Fares as Papà Bob 
 Dina Sassoli as Evelyn Charleston 
 Paolo Ferrari as Pistol, il ragazzino 
 Edoardo Borelli as Eastman 
 Renato Malavasi as Peter Patt 
 Luigi Zerbinati as Dario, il parrucchiere
 Giulio Battiferri as Un acrobata 
 Liana Del Balzo as Una invitata al ballo 
 Armando Furlai as Un componente del circo 
 Lina Marengo as Una donna del circo 
 Alfredo Martinelli as Uno spettatore al teatro 
 Cesare Polacco as Il medico 
 Adriano Rimoldi as Orazio nell' Amleto

References

Bibliography
 Moliterno, Gino. The A to Z of Italian Cinema. Scarecrow Press, 2009.

External links
 

1940 films
1940s historical drama films
1940s Italian-language films
Italian historical drama films
Films directed by Guido Brignone
Films set in the 19th century
Films set in London
Films shot at Scalera Studios
French films based on plays
Films about actors
Italian black-and-white films
1940 drama films
Films based on works by Alexandre Dumas
1940s Italian films